Donald Partridge (22 October 1925 – 2003) was an English footballer who played as a wing half for Rochdale.
 
Partridge first played for Rochdale in the 1945-46 FA Cup, and made his league debut in the 1946-47 season. He remained at Rochdale throughout his career, clocking up 103 appearances and 2 goals. He retired in 1955.

Partridge died in 2003.

References

Rochdale A.F.C. players
1925 births
2003 deaths
Footballers from Bolton
English footballers
Association football midfielders